R. Sivaraman (died 2007) was an Indian politician and a Member of the Legislative Assembly. He was elected to the Tamil Nadu legislative assembly as a Dravida Munnetra Kazhagam (DMK) candidate from Tiruppattur (194) constituency in the 1996 election.

Sivaraman contested the Tiruppattur constituency again in 2001, when he was runner-up to K. K. Umadhevan of the All India Anna Dravida Munnetra Kazhagam.

In May 2003, Sivaraman, who was a close friend of M. K. Azhagiri, the son of DMK party leader Karunanidhi, came under suspicion when Azhagiri was charged with conspiracy in the murder of Tha. Kiruttinan, a former minister and senior figure in the party. He was taken into protective custody for a while because police were concerned about possible violence following their arrest of Azhagiri. Subsequently, he was conditionally bailed.

Supporters of Sivaraman were initially unhappy when the DMK decided not to let him run for the Tiruppattur seat in 2006. They were placated when he was given the opportunity to stand instead for the Sivaganga constituency.

More violent incidents with which Sivaraman, who owned a stone quarry, became associated occurred in 2007. In February, he was arrested on an allegation of hiring a group of henchmen to damage the offices of a business rival and attack staff there. Then, in June, an explosion that resulted in many injuries and two deaths, including that of P. Murugan, was considered by police to involve a dispute between a faction within the DMK led by Sivaraman and another led by K. R. Periyakaruppan. Murugan was of Sivaraman's group.

Sivaraman died in hospital, aged 46, on 8 July 2007. He was survived by his wife and two children.

References 

Dravida Munnetra Kazhagam politicians
Tamil Nadu MLAs 1996–2001
1950s births
2007 deaths